Lauri Kivari (born 23 March 1996) is a Finnish freestyle skier. He was born in Helsinki. He competed at the 2014 Winter Olympics in Sochi, in slopestyle.

References 

1996 births
Living people
Sportspeople from Helsinki
Freestyle skiers at the 2014 Winter Olympics
Finnish male freestyle skiers
Olympic freestyle skiers of Finland
Freestyle skiers at the 2012 Winter Youth Olympics
21st-century Finnish people